Oglala Lakota College (OLC) is a public tribal land-grant community college in Kyle, South Dakota.  It enrolls 1,456 students enrolled part- and full-time. OLC serves the Pine Ridge Indian Reservation, which has a population of about 26,000 and covers 3,468 square miles in southwestern South Dakota.

History
OLC is chartered by the Oglala Sioux Tribal Council in 1971. In 1994, the college was designated a land-grant college alongside 31 other tribal colleges.

Governance
OLC is governed by a 13-member Board of Trustees.

Campus
OLC has a decentralized campus system. There are OLC instructional centers in each of the nine districts across Pine Ridge Reservation in South Dakota. There are college instructional centers in Rapid City and on the Cheyenne River Indian Reservation.

Academics
From its initial status as a community college, Oglala Lakota has grown to now offer Baccalaureate degrees and a master's degree in Lakota Leadership along with certificates and A.A. degrees. OLC is accredited by the Higher Learning Commission of the North Central Accrediting Agency to offer degrees at the associate’s, bachelor’s, and master’s levels. Education graduates are certified by the South Dakota Division of Education to teach in K-12 elementary systems and to serve in school administrative capacities. OLC nursing graduates are certified by the South Dakota State Board of Nursing and eligible to sit for the registered nurse examination. The social work program is accredited at the bachelor's degree level.

Partnerships
OLC is a member of the American Indian Higher Education Consortium (AIHEC), which is a community of tribally  and federally chartered institutions working to strengthen tribal nations and make a lasting difference in the lives of American Indians and Alaska Natives. OLC was created in response to the higher education needs of American Indians. OLC generally serves geographically isolated populations that have no other means accessing education beyond the high school level.

References

External links
 Official website
 

American Indian Higher Education Consortium
Educational institutions established in 1971
Community colleges in South Dakota
Buildings and structures in Oglala Lakota County, South Dakota
Education in Oglala Lakota County, South Dakota
Two-year colleges in the United States